Yuka Ueno (上野 優佳, Ueno Yūka, born 28 November 2001) is a Japanese fencer. She won the silver medal in the women's foil event at the 2019 Asian Fencing Championships held in Chiba, Japan. She also won the gold medal in the women's team foil event.

At the 2018 Summer Youth Olympics held in Buenos Aires, Argentina, she won the gold medal in the girls' foil event and also the silver medal in the mixed team event.

She won one of the bronze medals in the women's foil event at the 2022 Asian Fencing Championships held in Seoul, South Korea. She competed at the 2022 World Fencing Championships held in Cairo, Egypt.

References

External links 
 

Living people
2001 births
People from Ōita Prefecture
Sportspeople from Ōita Prefecture
Japanese female foil fencers
Fencers at the 2018 Summer Youth Olympics
Youth Olympic gold medalists for Japan
Fencers at the 2020 Summer Olympics
Olympic fencers of Japan
21st-century Japanese women